Anoura is a genus of leaf-nosed bats from Central and South America. Anoura members lack or have a short tail, and are nectarivorous bats of small to medium size among the Phyllostomidae.

Etymology 
The genus Anoura was described in 1838 by British zoologist John Edward Gray.
The type species for the genus was the Geoffroy's tailless bat, Anoura geoffroyi.
It refers to the tailless character of these bats.

Note that Anoura, the bat genus, should not be confused with neither 'Anura', an order of amphibians, nor 'Anoures', the original spelling of this order.

Description
They have elongated snouts, as is seen in Glossophaga bat species.
Similar again to Glossophaga, these species have tongues with lingual papillae.

Biology
Anoura species consume nectar, pollen, and insects.

Systematics 
 Anoura aequatoris– While a 2006 morphological study suggested elevating Anoura caudifera aequatoris to species level, this conclusion has been challenged. Some believe that it is not distinct enough to warrant separation from A. caudifera, and that further analysis is needed. A 2008 study challenged that elevating it to a species overstated the amount of diversity within the genus, and that it should remain a subspecies. 
 Cadena's tailless bat, A. cadenai– The same 2006 study as above split A. cadenai away from A. caudifer. It was challenged by the same 2008 study based on the overall small sample size of the 2006 study, and the small morphological differences between A. caudifer and A. cadenai. A. caudifer has subsequently been considered monotypic by others, disregarding A. cadenai.
 Anoura carishina– This taxa was named and described in 2010 based on morphology, and differentiated a species that had previously been described as Anoura geoffroyi. Principal component analysis of A. carishina and A. geoffroyi have produced conflicting results on whether they describe the same species. Using mixture models, another kind of analysis method, shows that A. carishina and A. geoffroyi are indistinguishable.
 Tailed tailless bat, A. caudifer
 Handley's tailless bat, A. cultrata
 Tube-lipped nectar bat, A. fistulata
 Geoffroy's tailless bat, A. geoffroyi
 Anoura javieri
 Broad-toothed tailless bat, A. latidens
 Luis Manuel's tailless bat, A. luismanueli
 Anoura peruana

References

External links 

 
Bat genera
Taxa named by John Edward Gray